The Jacu River is a river in the Rio Grande do Norte and Paraíba states in eastern Brazil.

See also
List of rivers of Rio Grande do Norte
List of rivers of Paraíba

References
Brazilian Ministry of Transport
Brazilian Ministry of Transport

Rivers of Paraíba
Rivers of Rio Grande do Norte